Hijos del desierto is a Chilean telenovela created by Rodrigo Cuevas Gallegos. It premiered on August 23, 2022 on Mega. It stars Jorge Arecheta, Gastón Salgado and María-José Weigel.

Cast 
 Jorge Arecheta as Antonio Ramírez / Gaspar Sanfuentes
 Gastón Salgado as Pedro Ramírez
 María-José Weigel as Eloísa González
 Francisco Melo as Gregorio Sanfuentes
 Paola Volpato as Antonia Williams 
 Marcelo Alonso as Cornellius Bormann 
 Paloma Moreno as Margot Le Blanche
 Ingrid Cruz as Hermana Helena
 Claudio Arredondo as Neftalí González
 Francisca Gavilán as Ester González
 Carmen Zabala as Violeta Mondaca "La Gato"
 Fernanda Finsterbusch as Josefina Bormann
 Michael Silva
 Roberto Farías as "Panda"
 Rodrigo Soto as Hipólito Cárdenas
 Otilio Castro as Soto
 Guilherme Sepúlveda as Herr Braun
 Nahuel Cantillano as "Peineta"
 Simón Beltrán as "Piojo"
 Andrés Olea as Olegario
 Manuel Castro

Reception

Ratings

Awards and nominations

References

External links 
 

2022 telenovelas
2022 Chilean television series debuts
Chilean telenovelas
Mega (Chilean TV channel) telenovelas
Spanish-language telenovelas